Federico Nahuel Vázquez (born 31 March 1993) is an Argentine professional footballer who plays as a forward for Italian  club Gubbio.

Career
Vázquez started his career at Vélez Sarsfield and made his debut on 8 March 2013, coming on as a substitute to play the final 31 minutes in a 1–0 loss to Belgrano in the Argentine Primera División. In 2016, he had a loan spell at Instituto before joining Venezuelan Primera División side Estudiantes de Mérida. In August 2018, Vázquez joined Serie C side Siracusa having scored 20 goals in 29 games for Serie D side Troina the season before.

On 22 July 2019, he signed with Virtus Francavilla.

On 26 July 2021, he joined Catanzaro on a two-year deal.

On 17 August 2022, Vázquez moved to Gubbio on a two-year contract.

References

External links
 

1993 births
Living people
People from San Martín, Buenos Aires
Sportspeople from Buenos Aires Province
Argentine footballers
Association football forwards
Argentine Primera División players
Primera Nacional players
Club Atlético Vélez Sarsfield footballers
Instituto footballers
Venezuelan Primera División players
Estudiantes de Mérida players
Serie C players
Serie D players
Siracusa Calcio players
Virtus Francavilla Calcio players
U.S. Catanzaro 1929 players
A.S. Gubbio 1910 players
Argentine expatriate footballers
Argentine expatriate sportspeople in Venezuela
Argentine expatriate sportspeople in Italy
Expatriate footballers in Venezuela
Expatriate footballers in Italy